Marie Geneviève Radix de Sainte-Foy (1729 – 1809) was a French noblewoman as the mistress to King Louis XV of France, as well as to Louis, Dauphin of France in 1750–51.

Life 
Marie was the daughter of Claude Mathieu Radix, Seigneur de Chevillon and Marie Elizabeth Geneviève Denis. She married in 1750 to Jean François Boudrey (1701–1760), and in 1761 to Nicolas Augustin de Malbec de Montjoc, Marquis de Briges. 

According to the traditional description of the event, she received an invitation to an assignation from both the king and the dauphin at the same occasion; she showed her husband the invitation, and it was decided that she should accept the invitation of the king. Reportedly, she did so for monetary concerns. On a later occasion, however, she also accepted an assignation with the dauphin, and for a time she alternated as the lover of both who, as expressed by René Louis de Voyer de Paulmy d'Argenson, "sailed to  Cythera on the same ship".  In both cases the relationship was an unofficial one and in no effect was she ever an officially acknowledged mistress to either of them. 

For the king the affair was a temporary one; it took place in at about the same time as the king's affair to Irène du Buisson de Longpré, and she was not regarded a threat to the position of Madame de Pompadour. In the case of the dauphin, the matter was a more uncommon one and the secret affair caused discontent with Maria Josepha of Saxony, Dauphine of France, because it was not usually the habit of the dauphin to have affairs. Maria Josepha, however, reportedly became convinced that the matter was a purely temporary one during her pregnancy and that her spouse would never have an official mistress like his father. The affair did indeed prove to be temporary, and the dauphin would indeed never have an official mistress.  

Not long after this, Louis XV had Marie-Louise O'Murphy installed at the Parc-aux-Cerfs.

References

1729 births
1809 deaths
18th-century French people
Mistresses of Louis XV